Louis McLane House was a historic home located at Wilmington, New Castle County, Delaware. It was built before 1792, and is an example of an 18th-century urban residence.  It is a -story, three-bay, brick dwelling with a gable roof later modified for commercial uses.  It was the home of Congressman Louis McLane (1786–1857) and the birthplace of American politician, military officer, and diplomat Robert Milligan McLane (1815–1898) and Lydia Milligan Sims McLane (1822–1887), wife of Confederate General Joseph E. Johnston.

It was added to the National Register of Historic Places in 1973 and demolished in 2014.

References

Houses on the National Register of Historic Places in Delaware
Houses completed in 1792
Houses in Wilmington, Delaware
National Register of Historic Places in Wilmington, Delaware
1792 establishments in the United States
Demolished buildings and structures in Delaware
Buildings and structures demolished in 2014